This is a list of seasons competed by the Geelong Football Club reserves team in the Victorian Football League.  Geelong's reserves team has competed in the VFL since 2000, winning the league's premiership three times.

Notes

References 

Geelong Football Club
Geelong Football Club seasons
Australian rules football-related lists